Bernard-Henri Lévy (born 5 November 1948) is a French public intellectual. Often referred to in France simply as BHL, he was one of the leaders of the "Nouveaux Philosophes" (New Philosophers) movement in 1976. His opinions, political activism and publications have also been the subject of several controversies over the years.

Life and career

Early life and career 
Lévy was born in 1948 in Béni Saf, French Algeria, to an affluent Sephardic Jewish (Algerian-Jewish) family. His family moved to Paris a few months after his birth. He is the son of Dina (Siboni) and André Lévy, the founder and manager of a timber company, Becob, and became a multimillionaire from his business. His father participated in the battle of Monte Cassino during World War II.

After attending the Lycée Louis-le-Grand in Paris, Lévy entered the École Normale Supérieure in 1968 and graduated with a degree in philosophy in 1971. His professors there included French intellectuals and philosophers Jacques Derrida and Louis Althusser.

Inspired by a call for an International Brigade to aid Bangladeshi separatists made by André Malraux, he became a war correspondent for Combat in 1971, covering the Bangladesh Liberation War against Pakistan.  The next year he worked as a civil servant for the newly established Bangladesh Ministry of Economy and Planning. His experience in Bangladesh was the source of his first book, Bangla-Desh, Nationalisme dans la révolution ("Bangladesh, Nationalism in the Revolution", 1973). He visited Bangladesh again in 2014 to speak at the launch of the first Bengali translation of this book and to open a memorial garden for Malraux at Dhaka University.

New Philosophers 
After his return to France, Lévy became a lecturer at the University of Strasbourg where he taught a course on epistemology. He also taught philosophy at the École Normale Supérieure. He was a founder of the New Philosophers (Nouveaux Philosophes) school. This was a group of young intellectuals who were disenchanted with communist and socialist responses to the near-revolutionary upheavals in France of May 1968, and who developed an uncompromising moral critique of Marxist and socialist dogmas. In 1977, the television show Apostrophes featured Lévy together with André Glucksmann as a nouveau philosophe. In that year, he published Barbarism with a Human Face (La barbarie à visage humain, 1977), arguing that Marxism was inherently corrupt.

Notable books

In the Footsteps of Tocqueville 
Although Lévy's books have been translated into the English language since La Barbarie à visage humain, his breakthrough in gaining a wider US audience was the publication of a series of essays between May and November 2005 for The Atlantic Monthly, later collected as a book. In preparation for the series, In the Footsteps of Tocqueville, Lévy criss-crossed the United States, interviewing Americans, and recording his observations, with direct reference to his claimed predecessor, Alexis de Tocqueville. His work was published in serial form in the magazine and collected as a book by the same title. The book was widely criticized in the United States, with Garrison Keillor publishing a damning review on the front page of The New York Times Book Review.

The Spirit of Judaism 
In February 2016, Lévy published a book entitled L'Esprit du Judaisme. An English version, The Genius of Judaism, was published by Random House in January 2017. In his foreword he describes this work as "a sequel, 40 years later" to Testament de Dieu, his earlier, widely considered seminal, opus. The book explores the reasons why the State of Israel is considered to be a litmus test for Jews and non-Jews alike; as well as the roots and causes of anti-Semitism where it existed, still exists, or is newly nascent. But, most of all, the book is devoted to Levy's "defense of a certain idea of man and God, of history and time, of power, voice, light, sovereignty, revolt, memory, and nature—an idea that contains what I call, in homage to one of the few really great French writers to have understood some of its mystery, the genius of Judaism."

Notable movies

The Tobruk Oath 
Documentary released in 2012. It tells the diplomatic events of the Libyan Civil War seen from the inside by Lévy.

Peshmerga 
Lévy's involvement with the Kurdish cause goes back to the early 1990s. On 16 May 2016, Bernard-Henri Lévy's new documentary film, Peshmerga, was chosen by the Cannes Film Festival as a special screening to its official selection. Lévy developed his vision of the Iraqi Civil War, through the Peshmerga fighters (Kurdish fighters armed by Westerners and fighting in particular against Daesh). It consists of images shot on the spot by a small team, especially with the help of drones. It portraits notably the female regiments of the Peshmerga army.

The movie itself is, as stated in its official Cannes presentation:

"The third part of a trilogy, opus three of a documentary made and lived in real time, the missing piece of the puzzle of a lifetime, the desperate search for enlightened Islam. Where is that other Islam strong enough to defeat the Islam of the fundamentalists? Who embodies it? Who sustains it? Where are the men and women who in word and deed strive for that enlightened Islam, the Islam of law and human rights, an Islam that stands for women and their rights, that is faithful to the lofty thinking of Averroes, Abd al-Qadir al-Jilani, Ibn Tufail, and Rumi? ..."

"Here, with this third film, this hymn to Kurdistan and the exception that it embodies, I have the feeling of possibly reaching my goal. Kurdistan is Sunnis and Shiites, Chaldeans, Assyrians, Aramaic-speaking Syrians living freely with Muslims, the memory of the Jews of Aqrah, secularism, freedom of conscience and belief. It is where one can run into a Jewish Barzani on the forward line of a front held, 50 kilometers from Erbil, by his distant cousin, a Muslim, Sirwan Barazi… Better than the Arab Spring. The Bosnian dream achieved. My dream. There is no longer really any doubt. Enlightened Islam exists: I found it in Erbil."

A year later, Lévy said that "Jews have a special obligation to support the Kurds", and that he hopes "they will come say to the Peshmerga: 'For years now you have spilled your blood to defend the values of our shared civilization. Now it is our turn to defend your right to live freely and independently.. He received the 2017 Cinema for Peace Most Valuable Documentary of the Year Award for such film.

The Mosul Battle 
Documentary released in 2017. Alongside Kurdish fighters and Iraqi soldiers, Lévy chronicles, street after street, the liberation of the self-proclaimed capital of the organization Islamic State of Iraq and the Levant in Mosul.

The Will to See 
This documentary, released in 2022, shows Lévy visiting several countries before and during the COVID-19 pandemic as he documents various atrocities and humanitarian crises.

Political activism and social involvement

1980s and 1990s 
In 1981, Lévy published L'Idéologie française ("The French Ideology"), arguably his most influential work, in which he offers a dark picture of French history. It was strongly criticised for its journalistic character and unbalanced approach to French history by some of the most respected French academics, including Marxism-critic Raymond Aron.

In the 1990s, Lévy called for European and American intervention in the Bosnian War during the breakup of Yugoslavia. He spoke about the Serb POW camps which were holding Muslims. He referred to the Jewish experience in the Holocaust as providing a lesson that mass murder cannot be ignored by those in other nations.

At the end of the 1990s, with Benny Lévy and Alain Finkielkraut, Lévy founded an Institute on Levinassian Studies at Jerusalem, in honor of Emmanuel Levinas.

2000s 
Through the 2000s, Lévy argued that the world must pay more attention to the crisis in Darfur.

In 2006, Lévy joined the British debate over Muslim women's veils by suggesting to The Jewish Chronicle that wearing a veil had the effect of dehumanizing the wearer by hiding her face – and said, alluding to a passage by Emmanuel Levinas, that "the veil is an invitation to rape".

Lévy has reported from troubled zones during wartime, to attract public opinion, in France and abroad, over those political changes. In August 2008, Lévy reported from South Ossetia, Georgia, during the 2008 South Ossetia war; on that occasion he interviewed the President of Georgia, Mikheil Saakashvili.

In 2009, Lévy signed a petition in support of film director Roman Polanski, calling for his release after Polanski was arrested in Switzerland in relation to his 1977 charge for drugging and raping a 13-year-old girl.

2010s 

In January 2010, he publicly defended Popes Pius XII and Benedict XVI against political attacks directed against them from within the Jewish community.

At the opening of the "Democracy and its Challenges" conference in Tel Aviv (May 2010) Lévy gave a very high estimation of the Israel Defense Forces, saying "I have never seen such a democratic army, which asks itself so many moral questions. There is something unusually vital about Israeli democracy."

In March 2011, he engaged in talks with Libyan rebels in Benghazi, and publicly promoted the international acknowledgement of the recently formed National Transitional Council. Later that month, worried about the 2011 Libyan civil war, he prompted and then supported Nicolas Sarkozy's seeking to persuade Washington, and ultimately the United Nations, to intervene in Libya, ostensibly to prevent a massacre in Benghazi.

In May 2011, Lévy defended IMF Chief Dominique Strauss-Kahn when Kahn was accused of sexually assaulting a chambermaid in New York City. Lévy questioned the credibility of the charges against Strauss-Kahn, asking The Daily Beast, "how a chambermaid could have walked in alone, contrary to the habitual practice of most of New York's grand hotels of sending a 'cleaning brigade' of two people, into the room of one of the most closely watched figures on the planet."

In May 2011, Lévy argued for military intervention in Syria against Bashar al-Assad after violence against civilians in response to the 2011 Syrian uprising. He repeated his position in a letter to the Weekly Standard in August 2013.

On 9 November 2011, his book, La guerre sans l'aimer, which tells the story of his Libyan spring, was published.

In April 2013, he was convicted by a French court for libelling journalist Bernard Cassen.

In 2013, Lévy criticized the international community for their acts during the Bosnian genocide.

Levy travelled to Kyiv, Ukraine during the Euromaidan in February 2014, actively promoting the events. In February 2015, he performed his play Hotel Europa at the National Opera of Ukraine on the first anniversary of the Euromaidan's toppling of the pro-Russian oligarchy of Viktor Yanukovych.

In April 2014, he visited Bangladesh for the first time since 1972 to speak at the launch of the first Bengali translation of his first book  Bangla-Desh, Nationalisme dans la révolution ("Bangladesh, Nationalism in the Revolution", 1973), and to open a memorial garden for Malraux at Dhaka University.

On 5 June 2018, he performed his one-man play Last Exit before Brexit at the Cadogan Hall in London. The play is a revised version of Hotel Europa and argues passionately that Brexit should be abandoned.

In December 2019, Lévy visited the Autonomous Administration of North and East Syria, where he met Kurdish fighters led by General Mazloum Abdi.

2020s 
In July 2020, Lévy arrived on Misrata Airport in Libya, then he met some Government of National Accord officials; his visit was met with protests near Tarhuna.

Criticisms and controversies 
Early essays, such as Le Testament de Dieu or L'Idéologie française faced strong rebuttals from noted intellectuals on all sides of the ideological spectrum, such as historian Pierre Vidal-Naquet and philosophers Cornelius Castoriadis, Raymond Aron, and Gilles Deleuze, who called Lévy's methods "vile".

More recently, Lévy was publicly embarrassed when his essay De la guerre en philosophie (2010) cited the writings of French philosopher Jean-Baptiste Botul. Botul's writings are actually well-known spoofs, and Botul himself is the purely fictional creation of a living French journalist and philosopher, Frédéric Pagès. The obviousness of the hoax, with Botul's philosophy being botulism, led to suspicions that Levy had not read Botul, and that he consequently might have used a ghostwriter for his book. Responding in an opinion piece, Levy wrote: "It was a truly brilliant and very believable hoax from the mind of a Canard Enchaîné journalist who remains a good philosopher all the same.  So I was caught, as were the critics who reviewed the book when it came out. The only thing left to say, with no hard feelings, is kudos to the artist."

In the essay Une imposture française, journalists Nicolas Beau and Olivier Toscer claim that Lévy uses his unique position as an influential member of both the literary and business establishments in France to be the go-between of the two worlds, which helps him to get positive reviews as marks of gratitude, while silencing dissenters. For instance, Beau and Toscer noted that most of the reviews published in France for Who Killed Daniel Pearl? did not mention strong denials about the book given by experts and by Pearl's own family including wife Mariane Pearl, who called Lévy "a man whose intelligence is destroyed by his own ego".

Who Killed Daniel Pearl? 
In 2003, Lévy wrote an account of his efforts to track the murderer of Daniel Pearl, The Wall Street Journal reporter who was taken captive and beheaded by Islamic extremists the previous year. At the time of Pearl's death, Lévy was visiting Afghanistan as French President Jacques Chirac's special envoy. He spent the next year in Pakistan, India, Europe and the United States trying to uncover why Pearl's captors held and executed him. The resulting book, Who Killed Daniel Pearl?, argues it was because Pearl knew too much about the links between Pakistan's Inter-Services Intelligence and al-Qaeda. The book was strongly criticized by both experts and Pearl's own family, including wife Mariane Pearl who called Lévy "a man whose intelligence is destroyed by his own ego".

The book was condemned by William Dalrymple, a British historian of India and travel writer, and others, for its lack of rigour and its caricatured depictions of Pakistani society. Dalrymple also criticized Lévy's fictionalised account of Pearl's thoughts in the last moments of his life.

Pie throwing 
Bernard-Henri Lévy is a favorite victim of pie thrower Noël Godin.

Threats 
Lévy was one of six Jewish public figures in Europe targeted for assassination by a Belgium-based Islamist militant group in 2008. The list included others in France such as Josy Eisenberg. That plot was foiled after the group's leader, Abdelkader Belliraj, was arrested on unrelated murder charges from the 1980s.

Personal life 
Lévy has been married three times. His eldest daughter by his first marriage to Isabelle Doutreluigne, Justine Lévy, is a best-selling novelist. He has a son, Antonin-Balthazar Lévy, by his second wife, Sylvie Bouscasse. He is currently married to French actress and singer Arielle Dombasle. The affair between Lévy and English socialite Daphne Guinness was an open secret known amongst US society columnists since 2008. On 13 July 2010, Daphne Guinness confirmed the stories to Harper's Bazaar.

Lévy is Jewish, and he has said that Jews ought to provide a unique Jewish moral voice in society and politics.

Lévy has been friends with Nicolas Sarkozy since 1983. Relations between them deteriorated during Sarkozy's 2007 presidential run in which Lévy backed the Socialist candidate Ségolène Royal and also described Sarkozy as "A man with a warrior vision of politics". However, they grew closer again after Sarkozy's victory.

In 2004, his fortune amounted to 150 million euros. The owner of seven companies, he inherited most of the fortune from his parents, which was complemented by stock exchange investments. In 2000 he was suspected of insider trading by the Commission des opérations de bourse.

Works 
Lévy's works have been translated into many different languages; below is an offering of works available in either French or English.
 , 1973 (reissued in 1985 under the title Les Indes Rouges).
 , 1977.
 "Response to the Master Censors". Telos 33 (Fall 1977). New York: Telos Press.
 , 1978.
 , 1981.
 , 1984.
 , 1987.
 , 1988.
 , 1991; translated as Adventures on the Freedom Road: The French Intellectuals in the 20th Century, 1995, Harvill Press, 
 , 1992
 , 1992
 , 1994.
 , 1994.
 , 1994.
 What Good Are Intellectuals: 44 Writers Share Their Thoughts, 2000, Algora Publishing, 
 , 1997.
 , 2000; translated by Andrew Brown as Sartre: The Philosopher of the Twentieth Century, 2003, Polity Press, 
 , 2002; translated by Charlotte Mandell as War, Evil and End of History, 2004, Gerald Duckworth & Co. Ltd [UK], 
 , 2003; translated by James X. Mitchell as Who Killed Daniel Pearl?, 2003, Melville House Publishing, 
 , 2004.
 American Vertigo: Traveling America in the Footsteps of Tocqueville, 2006, 
 Ce grand cadavre à la renverse, 2007, Grasset, ; translated by Benjamin Moser as Left in Dark Times: A Stand Against the New Barbarism, 2008, Random House Publishing Group, 
 , 2008, with Michel Houellebecq; translated by Miriam Frendo and Frank Wynne as Public Enemies: Dueling Writers Take on Each Other and the World, 2011, Atlantic Books (UK), Random House (US), 
 De la guerre en philosophie, 2010.
 La guerre sans l'aimer, 2011.
 L'esprit du judaïsme, 2016, Grasset; translated by Stephen B. Kennedy as The Genius of Judaism, 2017, Random House, 
 L'empire et les cinq rois, 2018, translated by Stephen B. Kennedy as The Empire and the Five Kings: America's Abdication and the Fate of the World, 2019, Henry Holt & Co, .
 , 2020.
 Sur la route des hommes sans nom, 2021.
 The Will to See: Dispatches from a World of Misery and Hope, Yale University Press, 2021.

References

Further reading 
 Dominique Lecourt, Mediocracy: French Philosophy Since the Mid-1970s (2001), new edition. Verso, London, 2002.
 Craig Owens, "Sects and Language", in Beyond Recognition: Representation, Power, and Culture, Scott Bryson, et al., eds (Berkeley, Los Angeles, and London: University of California Press, 1992), 243–52.

External links 

  (in English and French)
 
 
 
 * Institute for Levinassian Studies, co-founded by Bernard-Henri Lévy, Benny Lévy and Alain Finkielkraut 
  France's Most Famous Intellectual Urges Jews Not To Leave

1948 births
Living people
20th-century French male writers
20th-century French Sephardi Jews
20th-century French writers
21st-century French writers
École Normale Supérieure alumni
French film directors
French male non-fiction writers
French male novelists
French novelists
French people of Algerian-Jewish descent
French philosophers
Jewish anti-communists
Jewish philosophers
Jewish French writers
Lycée Louis-le-Grand alumni
Lycée Pasteur (Neuilly-sur-Seine) alumni
Neoconservatism
New Philosophers
People from Béni Saf
Pieds-Noirs
Prix Interallié winners
Prix Médicis winners
Sciences Po alumni
Algerian Jews